Robotech: The New Generation is a mobile video game developed by Big Blue Bubble and released by Airborne Entertainment for mobile phones.

Overview 
Robotech: The New Generation is a top down scrolling shooter. The gameplay covers the story segment of the Third Robotech War in the 1985 animated series over 20 levels, five environments and three playable Veritech Alpha Fighters.

The game received an editor's award from Wireless Gaming World. It was first available from AT&T Cingular on May 7, 2007 and Verizon Wireless in October 2007.

References

External links 
 Robotech: The New Generation   official website
 IGN: Robotech: The New Generation   mobile game review on CBS Games

2007 video games
Mobile games
New Generation, The
Scrolling shooters
Video games developed in Canada
Big Blue Bubble games
Single-player video games